Jean François Victor Aicard (4 February 1848 – 13 May 1921) was a French poet, dramatist, and novelist.

Biography
He was born in Toulon. His father, Jean Aicard, was a journalist of some distinction, and the son began his career in 1867 with Les Jeunes Croyances, followed in 1870 by a one-act play produced at the Marseille theatre.

His poems include: Les Rebellions et les apaisements (1871); Poèmes de Provence (1874), and La Chanson de l'enfant (1876), both of which were crowned by the Academy; Miette et Noré (1880), a Provençal idyll; Le Livre d'heures de l'amour (1887); Jésus (1896). Of his plays the most successful was Le Père Lebonnard (1890), which was originally produced at the Théâtre Libre. Among his other works are the novels, Le Roi de Camargue (1890), L'Ame d'un enfant (1898) and Tata (1901), Benjamine (1906) and La Vénus de Milo (1874); an account of the discovery of the statue from unpublished documents,

He was elected a member of the Académie française in 1909.

He was elected mayor of Solliès-Ville in 1919, had the ruins of the Forbin castle listed as a historic monument and had the Comédie-Française play his play Forbin de Solliès ou le Testament du roi René there.
 
He died in Paris, 13 May 1921.

Selected works
Poetry
 Les Rebellions et les apaisements (1871)
 Les Poèmes de Provence (1874)
 La Chanson des enfants (1876)
 Miette et Note (1880)
 Lemartine (1883) which received the prize of the Académie française
 Le Livre d'heures de l'amour (1887)
 Jésus (1896)
 Le témoin (1914-1916)

Novels
 La Vénus de Milo (1874)
 Le Roi de Camargue (1890), translated as King of Camargue (1901)
 Notre-Dame-d'Amour (1896), online at: 
 L'Âme d'un enfant (1898)
 Tatas (1901)
 Benjamine (1906)
 Maurin des Maures (1908)
 L'illustre Maurin (1908)

Dramatic works for stage
 Pygmalion (1878)
 Othello ou le More de Venise (1881)
 Le Père Lebonnard (1889)

References

Attribution

External links
 
 
 

1848 births
1921 deaths
Writers from Toulon
19th-century French poets
19th-century French novelists
20th-century French novelists
20th-century French male writers
19th-century French dramatists and playwrights
Members of the Académie Française
French male poets
French male novelists
20th-century French dramatists and playwrights
19th-century French male writers